Zimni stadion: ; ; , romanized Zimniy stadion — in Slavic languages, an indoor sporting arena, usually (but not necessarily exclusively) used for sporting events. Literally meaning Winter Stadium, the name can be interpreted in two ways — as a venue for competitions in summer sports in winter, or as a venue for competitions and training in winter sports.

Czech Republic 
 Zimní stadion Havířov — in Havířov (opened in 1950)
 Zimní stadion Karlovy Vary — in Karlovy Vary (opened in 1947)
 Městský zimní stadion — in Kladno
 Zimní Stadion, or Metrostav Aréna — in Mladá Boleslav (opened in 1956)
 Zimní stadion Opava — in Opava (opened in 1953, roofed in 1956)
 Zimní stadion Přerov — in Přerov (opened in 1971)
 Třinecký Zimní Stadion, or Werk Arena — in Třinec (opened in 1967, roofed in 1976)
 Zimní stadion Na Lapači — in Vsetín (opened in 1966)
 Zimní stadion Luďka Čajky — in Zlín (opened in 1957)

Slovakia 
 Zimný štadión Liptovský Mikuláš — in Liptovský Mikuláš (opened in 1949)

Russia 
 Zimniy Stadion (Petersburg) — in Saint Petersburg (opened in 1949 in Leningrad)